The Coalition for Clean and Fair Elections or Bersih (meaning clean in Malay) is a coalition of non-governmental organisations (NGOs) which seeks to reform the current electoral system in Malaysia to improve its democracy by ensuring free, clean and fair elections among other reforms.

The idea of Bersih was initiated by five opposition parties in 2005 which later included other NGOs in this as well.

It was officially formed on 23 November 2006 as a joint communiqué that comprised leaders from political parties, civil society groups and NGOs. Bersih accused the Election Commission under Prime Minister's Department for manipulating the electoral process to give an unfair advantage to the ruling National Front coalition. Bersih claimed that the electoral roll was marred by irregularities such as gerrymandering, phantom voters, malapportionment and postal vote frauds.  On 10 November 2007, Bersih organised the first rally with 10,000 to 40,000 turnout and held a public demonstration at Dataran Merdeka, Kuala Lumpur. Supporters of Bersih were urged to wear yellow T-shirts as a symbol of protest. The rally was often credited for the shift in political landscape in 2008 general election, when the incumbent National Front coalition failed to obtain a two-thirds supermajority for the first time since 1969.

In April 2010, the coalition was relaunched as an entirely civil society movement ("Bersih 2.0") unaffiliated to any political party. On 19 June 2011, former president of the Bar Council, Dato' Ambiga Sreenevasan became the chairperson of the coalition. In 2011 and 2012, two more rallies (Bersih 2.0 and Bersih 3.0) were organised seeing that the demands for the electoral reforms have not been met by the Electoral Commission.

History
Bersih started out as a Joint Action Committee for Electoral Reform which was formed in July 2005. In the following year September 2006, an Electoral Reform Workshop was held in Kuala Lumpur whereby the various leaders from political parties, civil society groups and NGOs, including Wan Azizah Wan Ismail, Lim Guan Eng, PAS, Nasharudin Mat Isa, Teresa Kok, Syed Shahir Syed Mohamud among others, came together to formulate a joint communiqué. The main objective of this meeting is to advocate for a clean and fair election in Malaysia.

2007 Bersih rally

On Saturday 10 November 2007, Bersih held the first mass rally to make four demands to ensure a clean and fair electoral process in Malaysia:
 Clean up of the electoral roll
 Use of indelible ink
 Abolition of postal voting for military and police personnel
 Free and fair access to mass media for all parties

The rally took place in the area of Kuala Lumpur and Petaling Jaya around Dataran Merdeka (Independence Square) and Istana Negara (The National Palace). Bersih estimated the turnout to be at least 30,000, while the official claimed there were 10,000 protesters. Yellow shirts and ribbons were used as the symbol of protest as yellow is also the colour for citizen actions worldwide and for press freedom movement. A memorandum containing the four demands was submitted to the Yang di-Pertuan Agong, Malaysia's head of state, during the rally.

Malaysian police refused to issue a permit for the rally, rendering the rally illegal. Tear gas and chemical-laced water cannon were used by the riot police to disperse the crowd. 245 people were detained following the protest.

Following the initial rally, Bersih indicated it may hold another street demonstration if government extended the tenure of Election Commission (EC) chairperson Abdul Rashid Abdul Rahman.  On 20 November 2007, Minister in the Prime Minister's Department Nazri Aziz tabled a first reading of the Constitution (Amendment) Bill 2007 that sought to extend the retirement age of members of Election Commission (EC) from 65 to 66. Parliament passed legislation on 11 December to increase EC members' retirement age from 65 to 66.

2011 Bersih 2.0 rally

The 2007 rally had raised Malaysian citizens' awareness to the irregularities and controversies in the electoral system. Ahead of the anticipated 2012 13th general election, Bersih scheduled a second public demonstration at Kuala Lumpur on 9 July 2011. Bersih 2.0 rally, also called the Walk for Democracy, called for eight points, including the four demands that remained not met in the 2008 general election:
 Clean up of the electoral roll
 Reform of postal ballot
 Use of indelible ink
 Minimum 21 days of campaign period
 Free and fair access to mass media for all parties
 Strengthening of public institutions
 No corruption
 No dirty politics

Bersih 2.0 was endorsed by 62 NGOs and joined by rallies in more than 30 international cities by oversea Malaysians in solidarity. The rally was again denied a permit. Plans for the demonstration were extensively criticised by the government and pro-government media. Police set up multiple road blocks around Kuala Lumpur and arrested 225 Bersih supporters in the lead-up to the event.

After being granted an audience with the Yang di-Pertuan Agong to discuss the issue, Bersih subsequently agreed on 5 July 2011 to move the rally from the streets to Stadium Merdeka. Estimates of the turnout on 9 July 2011 ranged from 10,000 to 50,000. The police deployed tear gas and water cannons to break up the protest and arrested more than 1600 protesters, including Ambiga and several event organisers and opposition figures.

2012 Bersih 3.0 rally

Following the Bersih 2.0 demonstration, the Malaysian government set up Parliamentary Select Committee (PSC) on 2 October 2011 to respond to the electoral issues. In early April 2012, PSC released a report with 22 recommendations to improve the electoral system. The report was received and passed by the Dewan Rakyat (House of Representatives) on 3 April 2012 according to the voice of the majority without debate. An opposition minority report was proposed to be included but was rejected by the Speaker of the Dewan Rakyat.

Bersih was unsatisfied with the PSC reports as (i) the existing Election Commission was tasked to carry out the recommendations; (ii) many of the recommendations asked for a lengthy implementation period; (iii) many allegations of electoral frauds were not acknowledged in the report. In light of the issues, the third public demonstration, namely the Bersih 3.0 rally, was announced and took place on 28 April 2012 at Dataran Merdeka. The Bersih 3.0 rally was a sit-down protest (Duduk Bantah in Malay). In addition to the eight previous demands, it called for:
 Resignation of the existing Electoral Commission
 Implementation of the 8 demands before the 13th general election
 Observation of the 13th general election by international observers

Bersih 3.0 was endorsed by 84 NGOs. In particular, it was joined by Himpunan Hijau (Green Assembly), a civil movement protesting the Lynas rare earth project in Malaysia. In addition to the main rally at Kuala Lumpur, smaller rallies were held in 10 other cities in Malaysia, as well as in 34 other countries.

Police again deployed tear gas and water cannon against the protestors, despite it being a peaceful demonstration. The chaos started when police began to scatter the crowd. Tear gas and water cannon targeted the exit points and the middle of the crowd.

Bersih People's Tribunal 

A tribunal was organised by Bersih on 18–21 September 2013 in regards to the general elections that was held on 5 May 2013, whereby invited witnesses gave testimonies on the irregularities and incidents of fraud.

There were also calls for Election Commission to resign due to the way electoral demarcations were formed in past redelineation exercises.

2015 Bersih 4 rally

Bersih 4 rallies were scheduled to be held on the streets of Kuala Lumpur, Kuching, and Kota Kinabalu from 29 to 30 August, 2pm until midnight.

The gathering places for the rally should be located at Brickfields, Pasar Seni, Dataran Maybank, National Mosque, and Sogo shopping mall, according to the Bersih 2.0 chairperson. This was the first Bersih rally that are racially imbalance, with Chinese predominantly at the rally.

2016 Bersih 5 rally
The Bersih 5 rally was held peacefully on 19 November 2016 in Kuala Lumpur. A Bersih convoy was also launched and targeted all parts of Malaysia to raise awareness of the current democratic problems nationwide.

Global Bersih
Global Bersih is a movement by Malaysian diaspora communities to lend support to Bersih and its cause. In conjunction with the Bersih 2.0 rally, Global Bersih organised rallies in 38 international locations with 4,003 overseas Malaysians in solidarity:

 New Zealand
 Wellington, Auckland, Christchurch
 Australia 
 Sydney, Canberra, Melbourne, Hobart, Adelaide, Brisbane, Perth
 China
 Suzhou, Shenzen, Shanghai, Hong Kong(SAR)
 Taiwan
 Taipei
 Japan
 Osaka
 South Korea
 Seoul
 Singapore
 United Arab Emirates
 Dubai
 Egypt
 Cairo
 Turkey
 Istanbul
 Sweden
 Stockholm
 Austria
 Graz
 Switzerland
 Zurich, Geneva
 France
 Paris
 England
 London
 Scotland
 Glasgow
 Northern Ireland
 Belfast
 Ireland
 Cork, Limerick, Dublin
 Canada
 Ottawa
 USA
 New York City, Washington DC, Chicago, San Francisco, Los Angeles, Denver, Portland

Endorsees
As of 28 October 2014, the 62 non-governmental organisations that endorse Bersih include:
 Aliran Kesedaran Rakyat (Aliran) (The Peoples Flow of Awareness)
 Anwar Ibrahim Club (AIC)
 ABIM - Muslim Youth Movement Malaysia
 All Women's Action Society (AWAM)
 Council of Churches of Malaysia (CCM) Youth
 Centre for Independent Journalism (CIJ)
 Child Development Initiative
 Dewan Perhimpunan Cina KL-Selangor (Jawatankuasa Hak Sivil)
 Educational, Welfare and Research Foundation Malaysia
 Empower (Pusat Janadaya)
 Friends in Conversation (FIC)
 Federation of Indian Non-Governmental Organisations
 Good Governance Penang
 Group of Concerned Citizens (GCC)
 Indian Malaysian Active Generation (IMAGE)
 Independence People Action Committee (IPAC)
 Islamic Renaissance Front (IRF)
 Jaringan Rakyat Tertindas (JERIT) (Oppressed Citizens Network)
 Persatuan Kebangsaan Pelajar Islam Malaysia (PKPIM)
 Klang Consumer Association
 Kumpulan Aktivis Media Independent (KAMI)
 Labour Resource Centre (LRC)
 LLG Cultural Development Centre 
 Majlis Kelab Bell Belia Tamil Malaysia
 Malaysian Association of Indian University Graduates
 Malaysian Dravidian Association
 Malaysian Hindu Youth Council
 Malaysian Indian Development & Unity Association
 Malaysian Indian Historical Association
 Malaysian Tamil Forum
 Malaysia Youth and Students Democratic Movement (DEMA)
 Micah Mandate, The
 Movement For Change, Sarawak (MoCS)
 Oriental Hearts and Minds Institute (OHMSI)
 Penang Independent Schools Education Society
 Permas
 Persahabatan Semparuthi
 Persatuan Alumni Han Chiang, Malaysia
 Persatuan Alumni Han Chiang, Pulau Pinang
 Persatuan Hak Asasi Manusia (HAKAM) (National Human Rights Society)
 Persatuan Pengguna & Sosial Daerah Petaling Jaya
 Pertubuhan IKRAM Malaysia (IKRAM)
 Pusat Komunikasi Masyarakat (KOMAS)
 Research for Social Advancement (REFSA)
 Rumah Anak Teater (RAT)
 Sahabat Wanita
 Saya Anak Bangsa Malaysia (SABM)
 Sembang-sembang Forum
 Sisters in Islam (SIS)
 Solidariti Mahasiswa Malaysia (SMM) (Students Solidarity Malaysia)
 Southeast Asian Centre for e-Media
 Students Reserve Unit (SERU)
 Suara Rakyat Malaysia (Suaram) (Voice of the People Malaysia)
 Tamil Foundation Malaysia
 Tenaganita
 University Malaya Association of New Youth (UMANY)
 Women's Aid Organisation (WAO)
 Women in Disability Association
 Women Institute for Research Development and Advancement (WIRDA)
 Writers' Alliance for Media Independence (WAMI)
 Youth for Change (Y4C)

Original member organisations
On 23 November 2006, Bersih issued its first joint communiqué with the endorsement from 25 non-governmental organisations and 5 political parties:

Non-government organisations:
 Aliran Kesedaran Rakyat (Aliran) (The Peoples Flow of Awareness)
 All Women's Action Society (AWAM)
 Centre of Independent Journalism (CIJ)
 Citizens’ Health Initiative (CHI)
 Civil Rights Committee, KLSCAH (CRC)
 Community Action Network (CAN)
 EMPOWER (Pusat Janadaya)
 ERA Consumer Malaysia (ERACON)
 Gabungan Mahasiswa Islam Se-Malaysia (GAMIS) (Coalition of Muslim Students Malaysia)
 Group of Concerned Citizens (GCC)
 Jaringan Rakyat Tertindas (JERIT) (Oppressed Citizens Network)
 Labour Resource Centre (LRC)
 Malaysian Trade Union Congress (MTUC)
 Malaysian Voters Union (MALVU)
 Malaysia Youth and Students Democratic Movement (DEMA)
 Persatuan Hak Asasi Manusia (HAKAM) (National Human Rights Society)
 Persatuan Ulama’ Malaysia (PUM)
 Pusat Komunikasi Masyarakat (KOMAS)
 Research for Social Advancement (REFSA)
 Save Ourselves Penang (SOS Penang)
 Solidariti Mahasiswa Malaysia (SMM) (Students Solidarity Malaysia)
 Suara Rakyat Malaysia (Suaram) (Voice of the People Malaysia)
 Tamil Foundation Malaysia
 Unit Pemikiran Politik (UPP) (Political Thinktank Unit)
 Women's Development Collective (WDC)
 Writers' Alliance for Media Independence (WAMI)

Political parties:
 Democratic Action Party (DAP)
 Parti Islam Se-Malaysia (PAS)
 Parti Keadilan Rakyat (PKR)
 Parti Sosialis Malaysia (PSM)
 Sarawak National Party (SNAP)

References

External links
 
 official website

Political organisations based in Malaysia
Electoral reform in Malaysia
2006 establishments in Malaysia
Democracy movements
Protests in Malaysia
Malaysian political slogans